Yiyan Wang is a New Zealand Chinese academic,  and as of 2019 is a full professor at the Victoria University of Wellington.

Academic career

After a 1999 PhD titled  'Narrating China : Defunct capital and the fictional world of Jia Pingwa'  at the University of Sydney, Wang moved to the Victoria University of Wellington, rising to full professor in 2015.

Wang teaches both Chinese language and Chinese culture, but much of their research is on Chinese language fiction.

Selected works 
 Wang, Yiyan. "Shanghai Modernity: Women and the Practice of Everyday Life." Literature & Aesthetics 17, no. 1 (2011).
 Wang, Yiyan. Narrating China: Jia Pingwa and his fictional world. Routledge, 2006.

References

Living people
New Zealand women academics
Year of birth missing (living people)
University of Sydney alumni
Academic staff of the Victoria University of Wellington